Eupithecia ancillata is a moth in the family Geometridae. It is found in central China (Shaanxi), Korea and Japan.

The wingspan is about 15–19 mm. The forewings are pale brownish grey and the hindwings are brownish grey.

References

Moths described in 2004
ancillata
Moths of Asia